Oberglatt is a municipality in the district of Dielsdorf in the canton of Zürich in Switzerland, and belongs to the Glatt Valley. Zurich Airport is partially in Oberglatt.

History
Oberglatt is first mentioned around 1153-55 as Obrunglate.

Geography

Of this area, 51.5% is used for agricultural purposes, while 10.4% is forested. Of the rest of the land, 30.7% is settled (buildings or roads) and the remainder (7.3%) is non-productive (rivers, glaciers or mountains).

The municipality straddles the Glatt river and includes the village of Oberglatt and the village section of Hofstetten.  The eastern border of the municipality is the Zurich Airport.

Demographics
, 32.7% of the population was made up of foreign nationals. Over the last 10 years the population has grown at a rate of 16.8%. Most of the population speaks German  (78.6%), with Italian being second most common ( 5.3%) and Albanian being third ( 3.8%).

In the 2007 election the most popular party was the SVP which received 46.6% of the vote.  The next three most popular parties were the SPS (16.2%), the FDP (11.1%) and the CSP (7.9%).

The age distribution of the population is children and teenagers (0–19 years old) make up 24% of the population, while adults (20–64 years old) make up 68.8% and seniors (over 64 years old) make up 7.2%.  In Oberglatt about 71.1% of the population (between age 25-64) have completed either non-mandatory upper secondary education or additional higher education (either university or a Fachhochschule).

Oberglatt has an unemployment rate of 3.39%.  , there were 63 people employed in the primary economic sector and about 19 businesses involved in this sector.  654 people are employed in the secondary sector and there are 57 businesses in this sector.  544 people are employed in the tertiary sector, with 120 businesses in this sector.

The historical population is given in the following table:

Business
It is the home of the Swiss office of the New Life Network.

Transport 
Oberglatt is served by Oberglatt railway station on Zürich S-Bahn lines S9 and S15. It is a 17 minute ride from Zürich Hauptbahnhof.

Education

The Primarschule Oberglatt system serves students at the kindergarten and primary levels. The primary school campus consists of four buildings. Three additional buildings house kindergarten students.

Two secondary schools serve Oberglatt students; Sekundarschule Rümlang-Oberglatt in Rümlang, and Sekundarschule Niederhasli-Niederglatt-Hofstetten in Niederhasli.

The Stiftung Tagesschule Oberglatt is in the city.

References

External links

 Official website 

Municipalities of the canton of Zürich